Stanley Creek is a stream in Wayne County in the U.S. state of Missouri. It is a tributary of Mingo Creek.

Stanley Creek has the name of Jaspar Stanley, an early citizen.

See also
List of rivers of Missouri

References

Rivers of Wayne County, Missouri
Rivers of Missouri